The Granite Mountain Reservoir (formerly Squaw Valley Reservoir) is a lake managed by the Bureau of Land Management in Washoe County, Nevada. The reservoir is a fishing destination stocked with several species of fish, including trout, bass and catfish.

Description
The Granite Mountain Reservoir is primarily fed by a large spring located less than a mile north. The lake has been stocked with fish by the Nevada Department of Wildlife.

Name Change
Due to the offensive nature of the word "squaw," the name of Granite Mountain Reservoir was changed on September 8, 2022 by the United States Board on Geographic Names.

Ownership
The reservoir and the valley below is private land, though public access is allowed to the east side of the reservoir only.   The dam serves as a bridge to travel between the two, however public travel across is not allowed.

References

Lakes of Washoe County, Nevada
Reservoirs in Nevada
Tourist attractions in Washoe County, Nevada